Sebastiania riedelii is a species of flowering plant in the family Euphorbiaceae. It was described in 1874. It is native to Minas Gerais, Brazil.

References

Plants described in 1874
Flora of Brazil
riedelii
Taxa named by Johannes Müller Argoviensis